"Have at it, boys" (also interpreted as "Boys, have at it") was a quote formerly used by NASCAR to describe the philosophy that the Sprint Cup Series drivers used starting in the 2010 season to solve their disputes on the race track. This practice was not abandoned near the end of the 2011 season and continued on in the 2012 season.

Summary
NASCAR fans (in addition to fans of car racing in general) have jointly accused the people in charge of NASCAR for making racing "too sterile" and "too calm" during the past seasons of its existence. Robin Pemberton said those words during the 2010 pre-season Sprint Media Tour in Concord, North Carolina. Racing without significant penalties for the drivers seemed to be the definition of this catch phrase. People were beginning to follow the sport more thanks to this new "attitude" towards racing competition. The final laps of the 2011 Showtime Southern 500 saw Kyle Busch get tangled up with Kevin Harvick and Clint Bowyer. Many run-ins in the past have involved Jeff Gordon; especially during the 1997 Winston Cup Series season. With the fans' interest at heart and the increased safety of the new car, NASCAR refused to change the way which they policed the racing events;. Even in this "have-at-it" era of racing, there were clear limits to what drivers can do to each other. "One of the limits is if drivers put each other into danger", Brian France explained in an interview after the Harvick-Busch incident at pit road. This also applied to the Ron Hornaday Jr.-Kyle Busch incident at the 2011 WinStar World Casino 350K race. After Busch's one-weekend ban for the incident and also after Dan Wheldon's death, the "have at it, boys" era officially came to an end. NASCAR took this action under rules that allow it to park a driver in order to ensure the "orderly conduct of the event," an action which is not appealable. Since the drivers didn't solve this problem amongst themselves, the drivers did not "have at it;" NASCAR's officials had to solve this problem without any input from the drivers themselves.

NASCAR's action mathematically eliminated Busch from contention for the Sprint Cup in 2011, though any realistic chance of him winning it ended earlier in the Chase.

References

NASCAR terminology
2010 in NASCAR